Cleo Page (May 25, 1928 – February 19, 1979) was an American blues guitarist, singer and songwriter, whose recorded work was released on several singles and an album in his lifetime, with a compilation album issued in 2022. Details of his life are sketchy, and he has been a subject of conjecture among blues historians.

Biography
He was born Cleo Mallard near Shamrock, Natchitoches Parish, Louisiana, United States. Little is known of his early life, but it is thought he relocated to Los Angeles by the early 1950s. 

His musical career appears to have commenced in 1955 when, in the June of that year, Federal Records released a single credited to the C. Page Orchestra with Ernest Johns.  It had "Aline" written by Page as the A-side. In September the same year, Aladdin Records issued a single with the accreditation given to Rolling Crew with Orchestra, with Page writing and singing on the A-side "Home On Alcatraz". "If You Ever Get Lonesome" was co-written by Johnny Otis and Page and recorded by Preston Love and His Orchestra (with vocals by Roy "Happy" Easter) and released in December 1955.

In 1956, Page and Otis co-penned the track "Bad Bad Bulldog", which appeared on the B-side of a single credited to 'Little Arthur Matthews Featured with Johnny Otis Orchestra'. Around the same time another Page penned track, "I've Been Blind, Blind, Blind", was recorded by the singer Robert McKirby, although it remained unreleased for many years. It finally appeared on the 1992 compilation album, Dapper Cats, Groovy Tunes & Hot Guitars (Ace Records).

In 1958, a single credited to Curley Page and Band, was released on Dalton Records. The A-side was the instrumental track, "East Imperial". In 1963, another single similarly credited and published by the same label, included the tracks "I Believed in a Woman" and "Boot Hill". It is the latter release that has been the subject of continuing debate and speculation (see 'Conjecture' section below).

In 1970, Page reappeared playing guitar on a one-off single, "Boo Bam" / "Pages of Time", credited to Pages of Time. It was released by CB Records. A year later, the two-part composition "Black Man (Too Tough To Die)" appeared on Wonder Records. It was credited to Page, and Page's humorous comments were balanced throughout with lyrics sprinkled with curses and threats. The single's label explained that it was recorded by 'Black Man Power in the heart of the ghetto "Watts" California'. By this time, Page had become the owner and operator of the small Goodie Train and Las Vegas labels. His next single was issued in 1972. "Goodie Train - Part One", again credited to Cleo Page alone, was released on Goodie Train Records. This was followed the same year by "Leaving Mississippi" on Las Vegas Records.

In parallel with his own activities, he wrote and produced a single with the songs "Big Man" / "Old Man Me" on Goodie Train Records in 1972, for the obscure soul singer Frank Hutton. For added confusion, the vinyl was first released with the lead singer's name incorrectly listed as Frank Hutson.

The activity then seemingly lapsed until 1978 when the risqué worded and double entendre loaded, "Hamburger (All Americans Eat It)" by Cleo Page was issued on Goodie Train Records, and differently billed as "I Love to Eat It - Hamburger" on JSP Records (January 1979). The song was written by Page, who provided both vocals and electric guitar playing and produced the single. In 1979, JSP Records released his album, Leaving Mississippi. Jim DeKoster in Living Blues described the collection as "one of the most striking blues albums of the past year". For an unknown reason, "Hamburger" was not included on the album's track listing. The album, consisting mainly of Page original compositions, was reissued on CD in 2007 by P-Vine Records.

Page died at Daniel Freeman Hospital, Inglewood, California, on February 19, 1979, at the age of 50.

In 2022, the compilation album, Black Man - Too Tough to Die, was released by ADS Records.

Conjecture
The tracks, "I Believed in a Woman" and "Boot Hill", although credited to Curley Page and Band, reportedly had the vocals supplied by 'Syl Williams'. In the same year that those tracks were released by Dalton Records, a compilation LP Jimmy Witherspoon: Stormy Monday and Other Blues (Sutton Records) was issued containing identical versions of the two tracks.  Confusingly, although the LP cover read 'Jimmy Witherspoon: Stormy Monday and Other Blues also Mel Williams, Baby Moses, Sly Williams' neither the front nor back cover of the album, nor the record's label, specified who recorded which  track.  Presumably, "Boot Hill" and "I Believed in a Woman" were by Sly Williams. Blues historians have argued various viewpoints, primarily that 'Sly Williams' may be Cleo Page, whilst others stated that the artist was aurally similar to Clarence Samuels, and others postulated that 'Sly Williams' was probably Jesse Allen.

"Boot Hill"'s significance grew in importance in the following decades to become akin to a blues standard. In 1966, a version of the track was included on Siegel–Schwall Band's  eponymous debut album, although the songwriting credit was erroneously listed to Jimmy Witherspoon. In 1984, the song appeared on Johnny Winter's LP Guitar Slinger (Alligator Records), where no songwriting credit was listed; and in 1991 it opened the posthumously released compilation album. The Sky Is Crying (EPC Records) by Stevie Ray Vaughan. In the latter's case, the songwriter is listed as 'Unknown'.

Discography

Albums

Singles

References

1928 births
1979 deaths
American blues guitarists
American male guitarists
American blues singers
American male singers
People from Natchitoches Parish, Louisiana
Singers from Louisiana
Guitarists from Louisiana
Songwriters from Louisiana
20th-century American guitarists
20th-century American male musicians
JSP Records artists
P-Vine Records artists
Federal Records artists